Coleophora kahaourella is a moth of the family Coleophoridae. It is found in Spain, Tunisia and Libya.

References

kahaourella
Moths described in 1956
Moths of Europe
Moths of Africa